People Tree is a Fair Trade apparel company founded in 1991. The Company is based in London and Tokyo. It pioneered Fair Trade and Ethical Fashion and was the first fashion company to be awarded the World Fair Trade Organisation Fair Trade product label.

History

Early Years
The People Tree business developed from Global Village, an environmental campaigning NGO founded by British born Safia Minney in Tokyo in 1991. It began as a clothing catalogue which featured hand woven and natural dyed hand bags, clothing, and clogs made by women from Bangladesh. Because it was difficult to find fair trade apparel products of a high enough quality for the Japanese market, Global Village started to do its own design in house. Safia Minney said, "When I started out […] we were investing in labour-intensive process while the industry was going in the other direction: mass-manufactured fashion, using synthetics instead of natural materials. We were dealing with very disadvantaged people in remote places."

Initially the Global Village business was run from the home of Safia Minney and her then-husband James Minney, who later became her business partner in founding People Tree and with whom she co-owns the company. In 1995, Fair Trade Company KK was formed as a limited company in Japan by transferring the fair trading activity of Global Village, and a shop was opened in the fashionable Jiyugaoka district, in Tokyo. In 1997, Safia Minney added a Fair Trade Fashion Collection, using eco-textiles, including organic cotton, to the products sold by Fair Trade Company.  People Tree was working closely with textile artisan groups to help them meet environmental standards and develop their market potential, with two full-time designers.

In 2005, People Tree Japan launched its first 'prototype franchise' store in Tokyo.

British Expansion
In 2000, People Tree's business expanded to the UK where the brand formed a partnership with Co-operative Group. In 2006, then-CEO Safia Minney persuaded Top Shop executives to take People Tree into Topshop as a concession.

Recent History 
By 2004, the company had expanded into 20 different countries and turned over $1.79 million.  

In 2015, founder and CEO Safia Minney left the business after separating from her husband James Minney, who was Chief Financial officer. They still co-own the business.  

In 2021 an ecommerce website was launched as 'the new home of People Tree in Europe'.  

As of 2021 James Minney was CEO of People Tree.

Products 
People Tree designs, manufactures, and markets its own label. It implemented the first supply chain for organic cotton and was the first organization in the world to achieve GOTS (Global Organic Textile Standard) certification for a supply chain located in the developing world. In the past it has worked in collaboration with designers like Orla Kiely and Bora Aksu, as well as London's V & A Museum. People Tree is sold in 500 stores around the world including ASOS.com. The company also runs its own e-commerce business.

References

Clothing retailers of the United Kingdom
Retail companies established in 1991
Fair trade brands
1991 establishments in Japan